GrapeCity Mongolia LLC is a software house based in Ulaanbaatar, Mongolia, founded by GrapeCity and BSB Service LLC in 2000. It is one of the software vendors in the country providing mainly to payment, banking  and micro-finance sector.

References 

Software companies of Mongolia